Charles Deacey (6 October 1889 – 1952) was an English professional footballer who played as a centre-half.

References

1889 births
1952 deaths
Sportspeople from Wednesbury
English footballers
Association football defenders
Wednesbury Town F.C. players
Wednesbury Old Athletic F.C. players
West Bromwich Albion F.C. players
Hull City A.F.C. players
Grimsby Town F.C. players
Pontypridd F.C. players
Merthyr Town F.C. players
English Football League players